The list of shipwrecks in 1812 includes ships sunk, wrecked or otherwise lost during 1812.

January

2 January

3 January

5 January

7 January

11 January

12 January

13 January

16 January

17 January

18 January

19 January

20 January

21 January

22 January

25 January

26 January

27 January

28 January

29 January

31 January

Unknown date

February

1 February

2 February

6 February

7 February

10 February

12 February

14 February

15 February

17 February

18 February

20 February

21 February

22 February

23 February

24 February

25 February

26 February

27 February

28 February

Unknown date

March

4 March

5 March

6 March

7 March

8 March

11 March

13 March

14 March

15 March

16 March

18 March

19 March

20 March

21 March

22 March

23 March

24 March

25 March

26 March

27 March

28 March

29 March

30 March

31 March

Unknown date

April

3 April

6 April

9 April

10 April

11 April

13 April

14 April

15 April

16 April

17 April

20 April

24 April

26 April

28 April

29 April

30 April

Unknown date

May

1 May

2 May

3 May

4 May

7 May

8 May

10 May

11 May

13 May

15 May

17 May

18 May

22 May

25 May

27 May

Unknown date

June

4 June

6 June

9 June

10 June

17 June

18 June

28 June

Unknown date

July

1 July

3 July

6 July

7 July

10 July

11 July

12 July

13 July

15 July

16 July

23 July

26 July

29 July

30 July

31 July

Unknown date

August

1 August

2 August

7 August

8 August

11 August

13 August

14 August

15 August

16 August

19 August

20 August

22 August

26 August

27 August

28 August

29 August

31 August

Unknown date

September

1 September

2 September

4 September

6 September

9 September

10 September

17 September

21 September

22 September

27 September

29 September

30 September

Unknown date

October

3 October

4 October

5 October

6 October

7 October

8 October

9 October

10 October

11 October

12 October

14 October

15 October

16 October

18 October

19 October

20 October

22 October

23 October

24 October

25 October

26 October

27 October

28 October

29 October

31 October

Unknown date

November

1 November

2 November

4 November

6 November

7 November

8 November

9 November

11 November

12 November

13 November

14 November

15 November

16 November

17 November

18 November

19 November

20 November

23 November

24 November

25 November

27 November

30 November

Unknown date

December

1 December

4 December

5 December

6 December

7 December

8 December

9 December

10 December

11 December

13 December

15 December

16 December

17 December

18 December

19 December

20 December

21 December

22 December

23 December

27 December

29 December

30 December

Unknown date

Unknown date

References

1812